Mahvalipur, also called Mohablipur, is a village and a Gram Panchayat in Gautam Budh Nagar district in the Indian state of Uttar Pradesh.  The population was 1,422 at the 2011 Indian census.

Location 
Mohablipur is located in the suburbs of Jewar about 7 km about 67 km from Noida, 47 km from Greater Noida, 40 km from Gautam Buddha University and 35 km from Khair. It is situated on the northeast bank of the Yamuna River.

References 

Villages in Gautam Buddh Nagar district